Ruby Yang (楊紫燁; Simplified Chinese: 杨紫烨), is a Hong Kong American documentary filmmaker.

Biography
Originally from Hong Kong, Yang has worked on a range of feature and documentary films exploring Chinese themes as director and editor. She studied Filmmaking at the San Francisco Art Institute in 1977. After graduation, she worked as an editor on many Chinese American documentaries and mainstream Hollywood films. She won an Academy Award for Best Documentary Short Subject for The Blood of Yingzhou District (2006) and received other awards including an Emmy, the DuPont-Columbia Journalism Award, FilmAid Asia's Humanitarian Award, the Global Health Council Media Award and two IDA Pare Lorentz Award nominations.

In 2003, along with filmmaker Thomas F. Lennon, Yang founded the Chang Ai Media Project to raise HIV/AIDS awareness in China. Since then, its documentaries and public service announcements have been seen by hundreds of millions of Chinese viewers. Lennon and Yang made a trilogy of short documentary films about modern China, including The Blood of Yingzhou District, Tongzhi in Love (2008) and The Warriors of Qiugang, which was nominated for Best Documentary Short Subject in 2011.

Yang relocated to Beijing in 2004 and moved back to Hong Kong in 2013.  She was appointed by the University of Hong Kong as Hung Leung Hau Ling Distinguished Fellow in Humanities in the fall of 2013. Her recent feature documentary My Voice, My Life  《争氣》opened in 13 theatres in Hong Kong and Macau. The Wall Street Journal named it "Hong Kong’s five most notable films of 2014". It won the 2015 NPT Human Spirit Award at the Nashville Film Festival.

In 2015, Yang led the establishment of a new documentary project, named HK Documentary Initiative, aiming at fostering the development of the Hong Kong documentary industry. The efforts of the project fall into three categories, Seed Grants, Master Class, and Documentary Literacy. Yang herself is the director and one of the creative advisors to support emerging documentary filmmakers in Hong Kong.

Selected filmography (as director)
My Voice, My Life Revisited  《繼續爭氣》/《继续争气》2020
Ritoma 《仁多瑪/《仁多玛》2018
In Search of Perfect Consonance 《尋找完美第五度》/《寻找完美第五度》2016
My Voice, My Life  《爭氣》/《争气》2014
The Warriors of Qiugang  《仇崗衛士》/《仇岗卫士》2010
A Moment in Time  《聲光轉逝》/《声光转逝》2009
Tongzhi in Love  《彼岸浮生》2008
The Blood of Yingzhou District《颍州的孩子》2006
Julia’s Story《朱力亞的故事》/《朱力亚的故事》2005
China 21  《中國一二》/《中国一二》2002
Citizen Hong Kong  《風雨故園》/《风雨故园》1999

Selected filmography (as editor)

Becoming American : The Chinese Experience"  2003
Autumn in New York 2000
Xiu Xiu: The Sent Down Girl 1998
Street Soldier 1997
All Power to the People 1996
"A.K.A. Don Bonus"  1995
China: The Wild East  1994

See also
HIV/AIDS in the People's Republic of China

References

External links
Official website

Directors of Best Documentary Short Subject Academy Award winners
American documentary film producers
American film directors of Hong Kong descent
American film producers
American television directors
American people of Chinese descent
Hong Kong emigrants to the United States
American expatriates in China
Living people
Chinese documentary filmmakers
American documentary film directors
Hong Kong artists
Hong Kong women artists
American women documentary filmmakers
Year of birth missing (living people)
American women television directors
21st-century American women